Dennis H. Black (born December 18, 1939) was a Democratic politician, from Lynnville Iowa. Black holds a bachelor's degree in forest management and a master's degree in natural resource economics from Utah State University. He was an author of The Resource Enhancement and Protection (REAP) Fund while chairing the House Natural Resources Committee in Iowa's 73rd General Assembly.

Black's career includes work as a natural resource analyst and consultant, service as the director of the Jasper County Conservation Board from 1970 to 2005, and the author of numerous natural resource management publications. His civic involvement includes service on the Newton Community Schools Board of Education, Jasper County Soil and Water District Commission, Des Moines River Greenbelt Commission, the Iowa Capitol Planning Commission, Jasper Community Foundation, and Terrace Hill Commission. He has also chaired the Jasper County Economic Development Commission.

References

External links
Senator Dennis Black official Iowa Legislature site
Senator Dennis Black official Iowa General Assembly site
State Senator Dennis Black official constituency site
 
Senator Dennis Black's Photo Gallery at Picasa

1939 births
Living people
Democratic Party Iowa state senators
Utah State University alumni
Democratic Party members of the Iowa House of Representatives
People from Cedar County, Nebraska
People from Grinnell, Iowa